Love Alone may refer to:

"Love Alone", single by Trisha Yearwood (Dan Colehour, David Grissom) from Love Songs 2008
"Love Alone", song by Utopia from Adventures in Utopia 1979 
"Love Alone", song by Charlotte Church from Four 2014
"Love Alone", song by Caedmon's Call from Long Line of Leavers 2000
"Love Alone", song by Sam Mangubat
"Love Alone", song by Chinese group Miss A from A Class
"Love Alone", song by Korean group Melody Day
"Love Alone", song by Korean singer UI from Palette